This is a timeline documenting events of Jazz in the year 1985.

Events

March
 29 – The 12th Vossajazz started in Voss, Norway (March 29 – 31).

May
 24 – 14th Moers Festival started in Moers, Germany (May 24 – 27).
 22 – 13th Nattjazz started in Bergen, Norway (May 22 – June 5).

June
 28 – The 6th Montreal International Jazz Festival started in Montreal, Quebec, Canada (June 28 – July 7).

July
 4 – The 19th Montreux Jazz Festival started in Montreux, Switzerland (July 4 – 20).
 12 – The 10th North Sea Jazz Festival started in The Hague, Netherlands (July 12 – 14).

August
 16 – The 2nd Brecon Jazz Festival started in Brecon, Wales (April 16 – 18).

September
 20 – The 28th Monterey Jazz Festival started in Monterey, California (September 20 – 22).

Album releases

Ornette Coleman and Prime Time: Opening the Caravan of Dreams
Abdullah Ibrahim: Water From an Ancient Well
Butch Morris: Current Trends In Racism
Bobby Previte: Bump The Renaissance
George Russell: The African Game
Rova Saxophone Quartet: The Crowd
Lyle Mays: Lyle Mays
David Liebman: The Loneliness Of A Long-Distance Runner
James Newton: Water Mystery
Hank Robertson: Transparency
David Torn: Best Laid Plans
Borbetomagus: Borbeto Jam
Mark Nauseef: Wun Wun
Kip Hanrahan: Vertical Currency
Patrick O'Hearn: Ancient Dreams
Don Pullen: The Sixth Sense 
John Carter: Castles of Ghana
Gerry Hemingway: Outerbridge Crossing
Leni Stern: Clairvoyant
Marc Johnson: Bass Desires
Terje Rypdal: Chasers
Tom Harrell: Moon Alley
Wynton Marsalis: Black Codes (From the Underground)
Wynton Marsalis: J Mood
Paul Winter: Canyon
Tony Williams: Civilization
Michael Mantler: Alien
Herbie Hancock: Village Life
The Manhattan Transfer: Vocalese 
Michael Franks: Skin Dive
Ben Sidran: On the Cool Side
John Hicks Trio: Inc. 1
Hugh Masekela: Waiting for the Rain

Deaths

 January
 7 – Johnny Guarnieri, American pianist (born 1917).
 10 – Cie Frazier, American drummer (born 1904).
 11 – Kenny Clare, English drummer (born 1929).
 18 – Georgie Stoll, American musical director, conductor, composer, and violinist (born 1905).
 26 – Kenny Clarke, American drummer and bandleader (born 1914).

 February
 22 – Frank Traynor, Australian trombonist and entrepreneur (born 1927).
 27 – Ray Ellington, English singer, drummer, and bandleader (born 1916).

 March
 13 – Annette Hanshaw, American singer (born 1901).
 23 – Zoot Sims, American saxophonist (born 1925).
 30 – Shizuko Kasagi, Japanese singer (born 1914).

 April
 21 – Irving Mills, American music publisher, musician, lyricist, and jazz artist promoter (born 1894).

 May
 2 – Larry Clinton, American trumpeter, bandleader, and songwriter (born 1909).
 24 – Joe Darensbourg, American clarinetist and saxophonist (born 1906).
 27 – Skeeter Best, American guitarist (born 1914).

 June
 15 – David "Buck" Wheat, American bassist, songwriter and recording artist (born 1922).

 July
 1
 Dick Vance, American trumpeter (born 1915).
 Lonnie Hillyer, American trumpeter (born 1940).
 4 – Chris Woods, American alto saxophonist (born 1925).
 11 – George Duvivier, American upright bassist (born 1920).

 August
 1 – Sam Wooding, American pianist, arranger, and bandleader (born 1895).
 11 – Nick Ceroli, American drummer (born 1939).
 19 – Cedric Wallace, American upright bassist (born 1909).
 30 – Philly Joe Jones, American drummer (born 1923).

 September
 3 – Jo Jones, American drummer (born 1911).
 6
 Johnny Desmond, American singer (born 1919).
 Little Brother Montgomery, American pianist and singer (born 1906).
 15 – Cootie Williams, American trumpeter (born 1911).
 18 – Ed Lewis, American trumpeter (born 1909).
 19 – Charlie Holmes, American alto jazz saxophonist of the swing era (born 1910).
 George Clarke, American tenor saxophonist (born 1911).

 October
 12 – Blind John Davis, African American, blues, jazz and boogie-woogie pianist and singer (born 1913).
 Nelson Boyd, American bassist (born 1928).

 November
 4 – Richard Williams, American trumpeter (born 1931).
 12 – Dicky Wells, American trombonist (born 1907).
 13 – Max Miller, American pianist and vibraphonist (born 1911).
 24 – Big Joe Turner, American blues shouter (born 1911).

 December
 9
 Calvin Jackson, American jazz pianist, composer, and bandleader (born 1919).
 Charlie Munro, American reedist and flautist (born 1917).
 28 – Benny Morton, American trombonist most associated with the swing genre (born 1907).

 Unknown date
 Leon Prima, American trumpeter (born 1907).

Births

 January
 2
 André Roligheten, Norwegian saxophonist and composer.
 Marius Neset, Norwegian saxophonist, composer, and bandleader.
 11 – Newton Faulkner, English singer-songwriter and musician.
 29 – Jon Rune Strøm, Norwegian upright bassist, and bass guitarist.

 February
 2 – Melody Gardot, American singer, writer and musician.
 8 – Dario Chiazzolino, Italian guitarist and composer.
 19 – Kristoffer Lo, Norwegian tubist, flugabonist, guitarist, and composer.

 March
 5 – Eyolf Dale, Norwegian pianist and composer.

 May
 14 – Tore Sandbakken, Norwegian drummer and composer.

 June
 12 – Olivia Trummer, German pianist, vocalist, and composer.
 20 – Ellen Brekken, Norwegian upright bassist, guitar bassist, and tubist.

 July
 18 – Theo Croker, American trumpeter, singer, and bandleader from Leesburg, Florida.
 22 – Camila Meza, Chilean singer-songwriter and guitarist.
 25 – Tom Harrison, British alto saxophonist and flautist.
 31 – Aaron Weinstein, American violinist and mandolinist.

 August
 14 – David Six, Austrian pianist, composer, and multi-instrumentalist.
 22 – Kim Johannesen, Norwegian guitarist.
 30 – Rachael Price, American vocalist from Hendersonville, Tennessee.

 September
 10 – Live Foyn Friis, Norwegian singer and composer.
 22 – Aaron Diehl, American pianist.

 October
 15 – Øystein Skar, Norwegian pianist and composer.
 29 – Ximena Sariñana, Mexican singer-songwriter and actress

 December
 19 – Ine Hoem, Norwegian singer.
 29 – Alexa Ray Joel, American singer, songwriter and pianist.

 Unknown date
 Paul Carnegie-Jones, New Zealand pianist.
 Per Arne Ferner, Norwegian guitarist.

See also

 1980s in jazz
 List of years in jazz
 1985 in music

References

External links 
 History Of Jazz Timeline: 1985 at All About Jazz

Jazz
Jazz by year